Alexandre-Henry-Guillaume le Roberger de Vausenville was an 18th-century French astronomer and mathematician.

Works

References 

18th-century births
18th-century French astronomers
18th-century French mathematicians
Benjamin Franklin